The George R. Kayser House is in Kingman, Arizona. The house was built in 1911 in the Colonial Revival style. The house is on an important corner located in the residential area development of 1910 to 20. There was a housing boom in Kingman. The house is on the National Register of Historic Places.

It was evaluated for National Register listing as part of a 1985 study of 63 historic resources in Kingman that led to this and many others being listed.

References

Colonial Revival architecture in Arizona
Houses completed in 1911
Houses in Kingman, Arizona
Houses on the National Register of Historic Places in Arizona
National Register of Historic Places in Kingman, Arizona